The 2011 UNAF U-20 Tournament was the 7th edition of the UNAF U-20 Tournament. The tournament took place in Libya, from 6 to 10 February 2011. Libya won the tournament for the first time.

Participants

 (invited)
 (hosts)

Tournament

Matches

Champion

References

2011 in African football
UNAF U-20 Tournament
UNAF U-20 Tournament